In the workplace, an evaluation is a tool employers use to review the performance of an employee.

Usually, the employee's supervisor (and frequently, a more senior manager) is responsible for evaluating the employee. A private conference is often scheduled to discuss the evaluation.

The process of an evaluation may include one or more of these things:

 An assessment on how well the employee is doing. Sometimes, this may include a scale rating indicating strengths and weaknesses in key areas (e.g., following instructions, promptness, and ability to get along with others). Often, the supervisor and manager will discuss the key areas. Or, as some have dared to expose, employers often time don't care about following instructions, arriving on time, or the ability to get along with others. Michael Lewis (author), non- fictional author, once wrote about working at a financial institution: "The bosses rightly cared far more about how much money we squeezed from our customers than how much time we spent squeezing."
 Employee goals that are expected to be met (or have significant progress made) by a set time, such as the next evaluation. Sometimes, the employee may voluntarily offer a goal, while other times it will be set by his boss. A significantly underperforming employee may be given a performance improvement plan, which details specific goals that must be met to maintain their job.
 Sharing of feedback by a worker's fellow employees and supervisors. The employee is given his chance to share their feelings, concerns and suggestions about the workplace as well.
 Details about workplace standing, promotions and pay raises. Sometimes, an employee who has performed very well since his last review period may get an increase in pay or be promoted to a more prestigious position. However, a pay raise that is denied is not always the result of a poor review, as economic conditions and other factors dictate the ability for employers to raise their workers' pay.

The frequency of an evaluation, and policies concerning them, varies widely from workplace to workplace. Sometimes, an evaluation will be given to a new employee after a probationary period lapses, after which they may be conducted on a regular basis (such as every year). According to the 2014 Performance Management survey, 96% of employers perform annual performance evaluations and 44% of employers perform a 90-day performance review for new employees.

See also
Performance appraisal
Realistic job preview

References

External links
Sample Employee Evaluation Form
Self-assessment Form - anonymous and free
Employee Assessments: Organisational Value and Purpose (A Focalworks article)

Evaluation
Workplace